Iberica, a Latin word referring to the Iberian Peninsula, may refer to:
 a barangay in Iberica-Labo, Camarines Norte, Philippines
 Iberica, an extinct genus of multituberculate from Spain
 Centaurea iberica, the Iberian starthistle or Iberian knapweed, a plant species native to southeastern Europe
 Corixa iberica, a water boatman species
 Coronilla iberica, an ornamental plant species
 Forficula iberica, an earwig species
 Lallemantia iberica, a flowering plant in the family Lamiaceae.
 Potthastia iberica, a non-biting midge species
 Rana iberica, is a species of frog in the family Ranidae